Frank White (5 March 1927 – 12 September 1994) was a botanist who was an expert on African flora and curator of the herbarium at the University of Oxford.

References

1927 births
1994 deaths
20th-century British botanists
British phytogeographers
People associated with the University of Oxford